The Women's Allam British Open 2019 was the women's edition of the 2019 British Open Squash Championships, which is a 2018–19 PSA World Tour event (Prize money : 165,000 $). The event takes place at the new Sports Complex at the University of Hull in Hull in England from 20 to 26 May.

Egyptian Nouran Gohar defeated the French fourth seed Camille Serme in the final, which saw Gohar (seeded seventh) becoming the lowest seed to win the tournament in the modern era. It was a well deserved victory because she beat the number 1 and 3 seeds (Raneem El Weleily and Nour El Tayeb) on the way to the final.

Seeds

Draw and results

Semi-finals and final

Main Draw

Top half

Bottom half

See also
2019 Men's British Open Squash Championship
2018–19 PSA Women's World Squash Championship

References

2010s in Kingston upon Hull
Women's British Open
Women's British Open
British Open Squash
Women's British Open Squash Championships
Sport in Kingston upon Hull
Squash in England